Dame Olive Annie Wheeler, DBE (4 May 1886  – 26 September 1963) was a Welsh educationist and psychologist, and Professor of Education at University College of South Wales and Monmouthshire, now Cardiff University.

Early life
Born at the High Street in Brecon, Olive Wheeler was the younger daughter of Annie Wheeler,  Poole, and her husband, Henry Burford Wheeler. Henry Wheeler was a master printer and publisher. She attended Brecon County School for Girls. She received an Honours Central Welsh Board Certificate in 1904. She attended University College of Wales, Aberystwyth and graduated with a BSc in Chemistry in 1907, and a MSc in 1911. At Aberystwyth she was elected president of the Students' Representative Council. In 1908 she was awarded a double first in a Secondary Teachers Certificate, University of Wales.

Wheeler completed a DSc (Doctor of Science) in Psychology at Bedford College, London (now part of Royal Holloway, University of London) in 1916. She enrolled for the DSc in the Michaelmas term of 1911 at the age of twenty five. Her mother, Annie Wheeler, was a signatory on the form (her father was already dead), along with A. H. Lewis, a Baptist Minister in Brecon, and Uma Wright, Secretary to Brecon Gas Company.

Career
Her first teaching appointment was as lecturer in mental and moral science at Cheltenham Ladies College. She was later appointed to a lectureship in education at the University of Manchester, and served as Dean of the Faculty of Education. In 1921 she applied for the Chair in Education at Swansea University College. Wheeler stood as the Labour candidate for the University of Wales parliamentary constituency in the 1922 general election against Thomas Arthur Lewis. She was President of the Aberystwyth Old Students' Association in 1923–24.

Wheeler was appointed as Professor of Education (Women) at University College at Cardiff in 1925, as well as (temporarily) the Dean of the Faculty of Education. She was the first female head of department in the University of Wales. Her title was officially changed to Professor of Education in 1933. In 1947 she became chairperson of the Welsh Advisory Council on Youth Employment and chairman of the South Wales District of the Workers Education Association.

Wheeler was a fellow of the British Psychological Society. Three years after her retirement in 1951 she went to Canada on a lecture tour.

Damehood
She was created a Dame Commander of the Order of the British Empire in the 1950 New Year Honours for education and social work in Wales, particularly for her work with the University of Wales, the Workers’ Educational Association and the Welsh Joint Education Committee.

Death
She died suddenly in the Kardomah Café in Queen Street, Cardiff on 26 September 1963. In her will she left £27,434. She bequeathed her library of educational materials to Cardiff University, as well as funds to create an annual prize of £500 to be awarded to the university's top student in the department of education. She left £250 to the South Wales District of the Workers' Educational Association and Park End Presbyterian Church, Cardiff.

Affiliations
 Fellow, University of Wales

Bibliography 
 
 
  second edition, 1937.

References

1886 births
1963 deaths
Academics of the University of Manchester
British women academics
Dames Commander of the Order of the British Empire
Academics of Cardiff University
People from Brecon
Labour Party (UK) parliamentary candidates
Welsh educational theorists
British psychologists
Alumni of Aberystwyth University
Aberystwyth Old Students' Association
20th-century psychologists